Kevin William Gallacher (born 23 November 1966) is a Scottish former professional footballer and football pundit and co-commentator.

He played as a forward from 1983 until 2002, notably in the Premier League with Blackburn Rovers where he was part of the title-winning squad in 1994–95. He also played in the top flight for Coventry City and Newcastle United as well as in the Scottish Premier League for Dundee United and in the Football League for Preston North End, Sheffield Wednesday and Huddersfield Town. He made 53 appearances for Scotland, scoring 9 goals and was part of their Euro 92, Euro 96 and World Cup 98 squads.

Club career
Gallacher started his Scottish League career with Dundee United, where he spent seven years as part of a successful team under the guidance of Jim McLean. He made his first team debut in December 1985 aged 19 years old in a UEFA Cup tie against Neuchâtel Xamax and three days later played against Rangers at Ibrox. He soon established himself in the side with his fast and penetrating wing play. He helped United reach the 1987 UEFA Cup Final, scoring against Barcelona in the quarter-finals en route. United, however, lost on aggregate to IFK Göteborg. The following year Gallacher scored Dundee United's goal in the 1988 Scottish Cup Final, in the 2–1 defeat by Celtic. A week later he made his full international debut for Scotland against Colombia.

Gallacher moved to Coventry City in January 1990 for a transfer fee of £950,000 and became a fans favourite for three years. Having played for most of his career to date as a winger, Gallacher was used as a striker for most of his time at Highfield Road, and was the club's top scorer in seasons 1990–91 and 1991–92.

He then joined Blackburn Rovers in March 1993 for £1.5 million, as they looked to fill the gap up front left by the long-term injury absence of Alan Shearer. He made an immediate impact, scoring on his debut in a 4–1 win over Liverpool. However, two broken legs (the second sustained in his first game after the original injury) the following season restricted him to just one Premier League game in 1994–95 when Blackburn won the FA Premier League. He did score in that game, a 2–1 win against Crystal Palace.

Gallacher returned to full effectiveness in 1996–97, however, scoring 10 goals to help avoid a relegation scare. In 1997–98 he formed a potent partnership with Chris Sutton, scoring 16 goals himself as Blackburn finished 6th. However, injuries and inconsistencies meant he missed much of 1998–99, although he was the team's top goalscorer with 5 goals. Blackburn were relegated in 1999, just four seasons after having won the title.

He then moved to Newcastle United, becoming Bobby Robson's first signing as Newcastle manager. Gallacher was mostly used as a right winger, a role he adapted to well, and despite a lack of goals, was fairly popular with the Newcastle fans for his work rate.

Spells at Preston North End (where he scored twice against Kidderminster Harriers and Sheffield United), Sheffield Wednesday and Huddersfield Town followed before hanging up his boots in 2002, ending a career which had seen him score a total of 106 goals in 430 games in the English and Scottish leagues.

International career
Gallacher won 53 caps for Scotland, and was in the squads for the Euro 92, Euro 96, and 1998 FIFA World Cup tournaments. He scored nine goals for his country, six of them in 1998 World Cup qualification, a significant contribution to the successful campaign which included perhaps his most famous international goals, a double against Austria at Celtic Park in 1997.

Media career
Gallacher has worked as a co-commentator and studio analyst for BBC Radio Lancashire, BBC Radio 5 Live, Sky Sports, Setanta Sports, BBC Scotland and Channel 5. In addition to this he is also a columnist in the Lancashire Telegraph. In 2006 he published a book, Tartan Turmoil: The Fall & Rise of Scottish Football, a semi-autobiographical look at the problems faced by Scottish football. In 2010, he started working for ITV, commentating on FA Cup games.

Personal life
He is the grandson of the late Celtic forward Patsy Gallacher, who died before he was born. His uncles Willie and Tommy and cousin Brian were also footballers. The Gallachers are also related to another footballing branch of the family, John Divers and his son of the same name who both played for Celtic.

He married Aileen Binnie in 1987.

Honours
Individual
Scottish FA International Roll of Honour: 2000

Premier league winner, Blackburn Rovers, 1994-95

Career statistics

Club

International
Appearances

Goals
Scores and results list Scotland's goal tally first.

See also
List of Scotland national football team captains
List of Scottish football families

References

External links

International stats at Londonhearts.com

1966 births
Living people
1998 FIFA World Cup players
Blackburn Rovers F.C. players
Coventry City F.C. players
Dundee United F.C. players
Association football forwards
Huddersfield Town A.F.C. players
Newcastle United F.C. players
Premier League players
Preston North End F.C. players
Scotland B international footballers
Scotland international footballers
Scottish footballers
Scottish Football League players
Sheffield Wednesday F.C. players
English Football League players
UEFA Euro 1992 players
UEFA Euro 1996 players
Sportspeople from Clydebank
Footballers from West Dunbartonshire
Scotland under-21 international footballers
Scottish people of Irish descent
Kevin